The statue of Bruncvík is an outdoor sculpture by Ludvík Šimek, installed on the south side of the Charles Bridge in Prague, Czech Republic.

External links

 

Monuments and memorials in Prague
Sculptures of men in Prague
Statues on the Charles Bridge